The fifth and final season of The Twilight Zone aired Fridays at 9:30–10:00 pm (EST) on CBS from September 27, 1963 to June 19, 1964. It featured the same intro as the fourth season, but reverted to the original half-hour format. A color version of the opening was later used for Twilight Zone: The Movie.

Episodes

Notes

References

 

1963 American television seasons
1964 American television seasons
59 series